The 1957 United States Men's Curling Championship was held March 27 to 30, 1957 at Chicago Stadium in Chicago, Illinois. It was the first edition of the United States Men's Curling Championship.

The Marshall Field and Company was inspired to host an American equivalent to the popular Macdonald Brier in Canada.  Opening night of the championship included a performance by the Scotch Highlander band of University of Iowa, an all female bagpipe and drum band, and were televised by the local television channel WGN-TV. Ken Watson, three-time Canadian champion, was hired as the commissioner of play and tasked with overseeing the umpires. There were 2,500 spectators in attendance for the first draw. 

The tournament consisted of ten teams representing nine states, plus a team representing the then-territory of Alaska. Teams had to win their state playdowns to qualify. 

The team from Minnesota, representing the Hibbing Curling Club won the event, as the team with the best round-robin record of 8-1.

Teams

Round robin standings
Final round robin standings

Scores

Draw 1
March 27 
Fairbanks 17, Seattle 2 
Winchester 12, St. Andrew's 6 
Chicago 10, Portage 5 
Detroit 16, Minot 8 
Hibbing 15, Nashua 8

Draw 2
March 28
Hibbing 14, Fairbanks 7
Portage 8, Detroit 7
Chicago 15, Nashua 3 
Seattle 7, St. Andrew's 6 
Minot 10, Winchester 6

Draw 3
March 28
Minot 11, Seattle 8
Hibbing 15, Winchester 5 
Portage 16, Fairbanks 4 
Chicago 11, Detroit 5
St. Andrew's 18, Nashua 4

Draw 4
March 28
Detroit 13, Nashua 6
Minot 12, St. Andrew's 5 
Hibbing 12, Seattle 5 
Portage 18, Winchester 2 
Chicago 15, Fairbanks 12

Draw 5
March 29
Portage 9, St. Andrew's 6
Hibbing 10, Chicago 8 
Winchester 14, Fairbanks 4 
Minot 11, Nashua 6  
Seattle 8, Detroit 5

Draw 6
March 29
Seattle 8, Chicago 5 
Minot 9, Portage 7 
Hibbing 15, St. Andrew's 5 
Detroit 8, Fairbanks 7 
Nashua 12, Winchester 8

Draw 7
March 29
Detroit 13, Winchester 3 
Nashua 11, Seattle 7 
Chicago 11, Minot 10  
Hibbing 11, Portage  4 
Fairbanks 16, St. Andrew's 5

Draw 8
March 30
Detroit 12, Hibbing 11 
Minot 11, Fairbanks 9 
Chicago 13, St. Andrew's 7 
Seattle 7, Winchester 6 
Portage def. Nashua

Draw 9
March 30
Hibbing 12, Minot 6
Portage 11, Seattle 7 
Detroit 10, St. Andrew's 8 
Chicago def. Winchester 
Nashua 10, Fairbanks 9

References
 

United States National Curling Championships
Curling in Illinois
Sports in Chicago
1950s in Chicago
United States Men's
Curling
Curling